= Uri J. Nachimson =

Israeli-Italian author

Uri J. Nachimson in 2026

Uri J. Nachimson (born 1947) is an Israeli-Italian writer born in Poland. He has written historical and biographical books, including works about the Holocaust and his family history.

== Early life ==
Nachimson was born in Szczecin, Poland, in 1947, to Dr. David Nachimzon and Felicja Nachimzon (née Blumenkranc). His paternal grandmother was Ida Nachimzon (née Friedberg). His paternal family included the Hebrew writer Abraham Shalom Friedberg, who was David Nachimson's great-grandfather.

His family later emigrated from Poland to Israel.. He later served as a military photographer in the Golani Brigade and took part in the Six-Day War on the Golan Heights. He later settled in Tuscany, Italy.

== Writing career ==
In 2019, Valdichiana Oggi interviewed Nachimson about Lilly's Album. The interview also discussed The Polish Patriot and Identity.

Ebraismo e Dintorni published articles about The Polish Patriot and Lilly's Album..

== Reception and recognition ==
In 2016, Panorama included The Polish Patriot in a selection of books for Holocaust Remembrance Day..

In 2026, Nachimson's novel Kadosh, which had been entered in the unpublished works section, received joint fourth place in the 2025 edition of the Premio Letterario Internazionale “Il Narratore”.

Lilly’s Album is held in the collection of the United States Holocaust Memorial Museum Library.

The Polish Patriot is also held in the collection of the United States Holocaust Memorial Museum Library.

== Works ==
- The Polish Patriot (2014)
- Lilly's Album: Based on a True Story (2017)
- The Two Margheritas (2019)
- Broken Hearts on Boulevard Unirii (2016)
- Red Leather Shoes: The Beast of Auschwitz Had Found Her Prey. (2026)
- Rembrandt for Sale (2023)
- Seeds of Love: A True Story of Forbidden Love, Passion, and Destiny (2017)
- Isabella: A Forgotten Feminist Voice Between Zionism and the Bahá’í Revelation (2025)
- How We Studied in Italy: And Other Ways Not to Study (2026)
- Legacy of Shame: Secrets from a World War II Italian Village (2026)
- Kadosh: All Was Done in the Name of God (2026)
- The Cross and the Almond Tree: An Ancient Sicilian Tale of Forbidden Love (2025)
- Violette and Ginger: Based on Real Events (2021)
- Recalled to Life (2022)
- The Second Door (2026)
- Identity (2024)
- The Girl from Haukalolloo (2024)
- Fragments of Love (2024)
- In the Depths of Silence (2021)
- Deep Stains (2025)
